Douglas Dale Northway (born April 28, 1955) is an American former swimmer, who represented the United States at two consecutive Olympic Games.

Olympics
 As a 17-year-old at the 1972 Summer Olympics in Munich, Germany, Northway received a bronze medal for his third-place performance in the men's 1,500-meter freestyle (16:09.25).  

 Four years later at the 1976 Summer Olympics in Montreal, Quebec, he swam for the gold medal-winning U.S. team in the preliminary heats of the men's 4×200-meter freestyle relay.  

He did not receive a medal for his 1976 relay effort, however, because only relay swimmers who competed in the event final were medal-eligible under the rules then in effect.

See also
 List of Olympic medalists in swimming (men)
 List of University of Arizona people
 World record progression 4 × 200 metres freestyle relay

References

External links
 

1955 births
Living people
American male freestyle swimmers
Arizona Wildcats men's swimmers
World record setters in swimming
Olympic bronze medalists for the United States in swimming
People from Ontario, California
Swimmers at the 1972 Summer Olympics
Swimmers at the 1975 Pan American Games
Swimmers at the 1976 Summer Olympics
Medalists at the 1972 Summer Olympics
Pan American Games gold medalists for the United States
Pan American Games medalists in swimming
Medalists at the 1975 Pan American Games